Mzamane is a surname, and may refer to:

Godfrey Mzamane (1909–1977), a novelist, literary historian, academic and intellectual pioneer
Joab Mzamane (1920–1989), an agriculturalist and father of Sitembele Mzamane
Joe Mzamane (1918–1993), an Anglican priest and father of Mbulelo Mzamane
Mbulelo Mzamane (1948–2014), a South African author, poet, and academic
Sitembele Mzamane (1952– ), a South African Anglican bishop

Xhosa-language surnames